"The Chamber" is a song by American singer Lenny Kravitz, released on June 24, 2014 as the lead single from the album Strut.

Reception
Carla Hay of AXS stated, "“The Chamber” was the first single from Kravitz’s 2014 album, Strut. With its Chic-like bass groove and sensual vibe, it’s an underrated Kravitz song that may not have been one of his biggest hits but it’s still one of his best songs."

Music video
The music video for the song was shot in Paris, France, in Kravitz' apartment, and directed by Anthony Mandler. Released in early September 2014, it features Dutch model Rianne ten Haken.

Charts

Weekly charts

Year-end charts

Certifications

References

Lenny Kravitz songs
2014 songs
Songs written by Lenny Kravitz
Music videos directed by Anthony Mandler